Enamul Huq (born 2 January 1938) served as the Inspector General of Police of Bangladesh Police, and a member of the Law Commission from 2004 to 2007.

Education and career
Huq obtained his bachelor's and maser's in history from the University of Rajshahi and LLB from the University of Dhaka. He earned his Ph.D. in public administration from the University of New Orleans.

He joined Police Cadre in 1964 and trained at Police Academy Sardah and International Police Academy Washington D.C. Huq was appointed as the principal of Bangladesh Police Academy and served as the commissioner of Dhaka Metropolitan Police. He was appointed as Inspector-general of police of the Government of Bangladesh in 1991. He was Senior Advisor to JICA, Advisor, Embassy of Japan, and served as the President of JICA Alumni Association of Bangladesh.

Personal life
Huq is married to Anamika Hoque Lilly, an educationist and writer. They have one daughter, Aditi Titas Huq and two sons, Ashim Shatil Haque and Barrister Aneek R. Haque.

References

1938 births
Living people
20th-century Bangladeshi lawyers
Inspectors General of Police (Bangladesh)
University of Rajshahi alumni
University of Dhaka alumni
University of New Orleans alumni
Academic staff of the University of Dhaka